Dili Institute of Technology FC or DIT FC is a football club of East Timor based in Dili. The team plays in the Liga Futebol Amadora. They reached the 2016 Taça 12 de Novembro semi-finals before they lost 1-2 by the champions AS Ponta Leste.

Francisco Cosme da Souza Gama was their technical director.

Competition records

Liga Futebol Amadora
2016: 7th place (Relegated)

Taça 12 de Novembro
2016: Semifinal

References

External links
Official web
Facebook

Football clubs in East Timor
Football
Sport in Dili
Association football clubs established in 2002
2002 establishments in East Timor